Amand or Ammand or Emmend or Amend may refer to:
 Amand, East Azerbaijan
 Ammnad, East Azerbaijan
 Amand, North Khorasan
 Amand, Qazvin